Georges Dard (28 June 1918 – 2 May 2001) was a French footballer who played midfielder.

Dard was the son of a former Olympique de Marseille president, Gabriel Dard. He began his football career with Marseille, helping the club win the 1943 Coupe de France Final and 1947–48 French Division 1 title. After a disagreement with club leadership, Dard joined Spain's Sevilla FC in October 1948, joining his brother, Roger, who was a striker for the club. One season later, he returned to Marseille where he would spend most of his remaining seasons.

Dard scored 65 Ligue 1 goals for Marseille, placing him in the all-time top ten.

References

External links
 
 
 Profile 
 Profile
 La Liga profile

1918 births
2001 deaths
Footballers from Marseille
French footballers
French expatriate footballers
France international footballers
Association football midfielders
Olympique de Marseille players
FC Sète 34 players
Ligue 1 players
Sevilla FC players
La Liga players
Expatriate footballers in Spain
French football managers